Mateo Handig (born 14 September 1989) is a Filipino professional boxer who has been ranked as the world #1 mini-flyweight by the IBF.

Professional career
Handing has competed for titles in four weight divisions. He earned the rank of world #1 mini-flyweight by the IBF in October 2012 by defeating Katsunari Takayama, capturing the Pan Pacific title in the process. The fight would have ended in a majority draw had Takayama not been deducted a point for repeated pushing. Other contenders Handing has fought includes Paipharob Kokietgym, Nawaphon Kaikanha, and Drian Francisco. Handing also won the WBC–ABCO title in 2011 with a win over Bimbo Nacionales.

Professional boxing record

External links

1989 births
Living people
Mini-flyweight boxers
Light-flyweight boxers
Filipino male boxers
Sportspeople from Northern Samar